The 2014–15 Mississippi Valley State Delta Devils basketball team represented Mississippi Valley State University during the 2014–15 NCAA Division I men's basketball season. The Delta Devils, led by first year head coach Andre Payne,  were members of the Southwestern Athletic Conference. Due to continued renovations to their normal home stadium, the Harrison HPER Complex, they played their home games at the Leflore County Civic Center in Greenwood, Mississippi and one home game at The Pinnacle on the campus of Coahoma Community College. They finished the season 6–26, 5–13 in SWAC play to finish in eighth place. They lost in the quarterfinals of the SWAC tournament to Alabama State.

Roster

Schedule

|-
!colspan=9 style="background:#228B22; color:#FFFFFF;"| Exhibition

|-
!colspan=9 style="background:#228B22; color:#FFFFFF;"| Regular season

|-
!colspan=9 style="background:#228B22; color:#FFFFFF;"| SWAC tournament

References

Mississippi Valley State Delta Devils basketball seasons
Mississippi Valley State
Mississippi Valley
Mississippi Valley